Sargis Tonoyan (born 12 January 1988) is an Armenian Greco-Roman wrestler.

Tonoyan was a member of the Armenian Greco-Roman wrestling team at the 2010 Wrestling World Cup. The Armenian team came in third place. Tonoyan was also a member of the Armenian Greco-Roman wrestling team at the 2013 Wrestling World Cup. The Armenian team came in fourth place. Tonoyan personally won a gold medal.

References

1988 births
Living people
Armenian male sport wrestlers